
Year 325 (CCCXXV) was a common year starting on Friday of the Julian calendar. At the time, it was known as the Year of the Consulship of Proculus and Paulinus (or, less frequently, year 1078 Ab urbe condita). The denomination 325 for this year has been used since the early medieval period, when the Anno Domini calendar era became the prevalent method in Europe for naming years.

Events  
 By place 
 Roman Empire 
 Emperor Constantine I personally assures the security of the Danube frontier by defeating the Goths, the Vandals, and the Sarmatians.
 Licinius is executed in Thessalonica, on a charge of conspiring and raising troops against Constantine I.
 Gladiatorial combat is outlawed in the Roman Empire.

 China 
 April 1 – Crown Prince Cheng of Jin, age 4, succeeds his father Ming of Jin as emperor of the Eastern Jin dynasty. During his reign, he is largely advised by regents, his uncle Yu Liang and high-level officials.

 By topic 
 Art 
 Constantine the Great, from the Basilica of Maxentius and Constantine, Rome, is started to be made. It is now kept at Palazzo dei Conservatori, Rome.

 Religion 
 May 20 – First Council of Nicaea: Constantine I summons an ecumenical council of bishops in Nicaea (Turkey). The Nicene Creed, adopted on June 19, declares that the members of the Trinity (the Father, the Son, and the Holy Spirit) are equal. The council decides that Easter is celebrated on the first Sunday after the first full moon after the vernal equinox. Arius is exiled to Illyria; his works are confiscated and consigned to the flames.
 The Church of the Nativity is built in Bethlehem.

Births 
 Ammianus Marcellinus, Roman historian (approximate date)
 Procopius, Roman general and usurper (approximate date)
 Wang Meng (or Jinglüe), Chinese prime minister (d. 375)

Deaths 
 October 18 – Ming of Jin, Chinese emperor (b. 299)
 Iamblichus, Syrian philosopher and writer (b. 245)
 Licinius, Roman consul and emperor (executed)
 Li Ju (or Shihui), Chinese general and warlord
 Sextus Martinianus, Roman Emperor (executed)
 Tuoba Heru, Chinese prince of the Tuoba Dai

References